Kangdong Airport(강동비행장) is an airport near Kangdong in Pyongyang, North Korea.

Facilities 
The airfield has a single asphalt runway 03/21 measuring 3070 x 112 feet (936 x 34 m). It is sited about 29 km east-northeast of Pyongyang.  It has a parallel taxiway for most of the length of the runway.

References 

Airports in North Korea